Orzech is a Polish surname. Notable people with the surname include:

 Artur Orzech (born 1964), Polish journalist
 Matt Orzech (born 1995), American football player
 Maurycy Orzech (1891–1943), Polish economist and journalist

See also
 

Polish-language surnames